The Port of Boca Chica is located in Boca Chica, Santo Domingo Este, Dominican Republic. 

The Port of Boca Chica was built in the 1950s and it served for the sugar transportation.
Currently it is a minor port in the country, but it handle cargo operations.

In this port is located the bout that generates the energy of the AES Company.

Port information

 Location: 
 Local time: UTC−4 
 Weather/climate/prevailing winds:  From May 15 until September 15
 Climate: mostly sunny, tropical. Hurricane season runs from June to November
 Prevailing winds: direction ENE–ESE
 Average temperature range: 28–30 °C

See also 
 List of ports and harbours of the Atlantic Ocean

References 
 Port of Boca Chica 

Boca Chica
Urban planning in the Dominican Republic
Buildings and structures in Santo Domingo Province